Musicality is the third solo album from English actress-singer Martine McCutcheon. The album features covers of songs from McCutcheon's favourite musicals, including Mamma Mia! and Les Misérables. Released in December 2002, Musicality was a commercial failure; it debuted and peaked only at #55 on the UK Albums Chart, spending just two weeks in the Top 100. It is McCutcheon's lowest-charting and lowest-selling album to date.

Track listing
 "Maybe This Time" – from Cabaret 
 "Zing Went the Strings of My Heart" – from Listen Darling 
 "White Christmas" – from Holiday Inn 
 "I Dreamed a Dream" – from Les Misérables 
 "The Lady Is a Tramp" – from Babes in Arms 
 "Diamonds Are a Girl's Best Friend" – from Gentlemen Prefer Blondes 
 "Don't Rain on My Parade" – from Funny Girl 
 "Out Here on My Own" – from Fame 
 "What I Did for Love" – from A Chorus Line 
 "There Are Worse Things I Could Do" – from Grease 
 "The Winner Takes It All" – from Mamma Mia! 
 "Can You Feel the Love Tonight" – from The Lion King 
 "Wouldn't It Be Luverely" – from My Fair Lady 
 "Wishing You Were Somehow Here Again" – from The Phantom of the Opera
 "The Man That Got Away" – from A Star Is Born 
 "Nobody Does It Like Me" – from See-Saw

Charts

References

2002 albums
Martine McCutcheon albums